Puig Drau is a mountain of the Montseny Massif, Catalonia, Spain. It has an elevation of 1,345 metres above sea level.
This mountain is located within the municipal limits of El Brull, Osona.

See also
Montseny
Mountains of Catalonia

References

Osona
Mountains of Catalonia